Spin Boldak attack may refer to:

Spin Boldak bombing, in 2008
2021 Spin Boldak shooting